Texas Board of Professional Engineers and Land Surveyors (TBPELS) is a state agency of Texas, headquartered in Austin, that regulates and licenses the practices of engineering and land surveying in the state.

The agency was established in 1937 as the Texas Board of Professional Engineers. In June 2019, Governor Greg Abbott signed Texas House Bill 1523 that merged the Texas Board of Professional Engineers and the Texas Board of Professional Land Surveying into the Texas Board of Professional Engineers and Land Surveyors, effective on September 1, 2019.

References

External links
 Texas Board of Professional Engineers and Land Surveyors
 

State agencies of Texas
1937 establishments in Texas